Darnelle Bailey-King (born 17 October 1997) is an English former professional footballer who played as a midfielder.

He played professionally for Rotherham United, whilst also spending time on loan with Gainsborough Trinity, Matlock Town and North Ferriby United.

Career 
Bailey-King made his professional debut for Rotherham United on 7 May 2016 against Hull City in the Football League Championship coming on as an 84th-minute substitute.

On 20 August 2016 it was announced that Bailey-King had joined National League North side Gainsborough Trinity on a months loan. The loan was subsequently extended to the end of the season.

In September 2017 Bailey-King joined National League North side North Ferriby United on a months loan. This was then extended for a further month.

He was released by Rotherham at the end of the 2017–18 season.

Personal life
In July 2019, Bailey-King was convicted, and sentenced to three-and-a-half years in prison, for his part in a south-east England county lines drug trafficking organisation.

Statistics

References

External links

1997 births
Living people
English footballers
Footballers from the London Borough of Lambeth
Association football forwards
Rotherham United F.C. players
Gainsborough Trinity F.C. players
English Football League players
National League (English football) players